Keystone Nano, founded in 2005, is an American-based company based in Pennsylvania, that creates nanoscale products to diagnose and treat human disease and improve the quality of life.

Patents 

Keystone Nano Inc. and team has been granted the follow patents:

 US Patent (8,747,891) - Awarded to The Penn State Research Foundation and Keystone Nano's Chief Medical Officer Mark Kester, this patent describes the process of loading Ceramide nano-scale liposomes with anti-cancer compounds and create a combination of therapies that benefit from the therapeutic activity of both Ceramide and the anti-cancer compound. This process improves the delivery of both compounds by targeting tumors and extending the time of biological activity.

FDA Approval 
In January 2017, the FDA approved the investigational new drug application, NanoLiposome, to assess the product as a form of treatment for solid tumors. Phase 1 trials will take place at the University of Maryland, University of Virginia, and the Medical University of South Carolina.

Compound 
Keystone was approved in 2017 to begin clinical trials to assess ceramide nanoliposome for possible use in treating cancer.

References

External links

American companies established in 2005
Companies based in Centre County, Pennsylvania
Nanotechnology companies
2005 establishments in Pennsylvania
Technology companies established in 2005
Technology companies of the United States